Sunamganj-1 is a constituency represented in the Jatiya Sangsad (National Parliament) of Bangladesh since 2008 by Moazzem Hossain Ratan of the Awami League.

Boundaries 
The constituency encompasses Dharamapasha, Jamalganj, and Tahirpur upazilas.

History 
The constituency was created in 1984 from a Sylhet constituency when the former Sylhet District was split into four districts: Sunamganj, Sylhet, Moulvibazar, and Habiganj.

Members of Parliament

Elections

Elections in the 2010s

Elections in the 2000s

Elections in the 1990s

References

External links
 

Parliamentary constituencies in Bangladesh
Sunamganj District